10 daily was a news and entertainment website. Part of the Ten Network Holdings, it was launched in May 2018 as Ten daily, and rebranded as 10 daily that October as part of an overall rebranding of the network. The site had 1.04 million visitors in September 2018. 10 daily creates content aimed at the 18 to 39-year-old demographic; as of May 2019, the majority of visitors were between 18 and 44, female, and accessing the website on mobile devices. On their first anniversary 10 daily launched a new tagline, "news with benefits".

The 10 daily website closed on 22 May 2020, though some content has been transferred to 10 Play and social media accounts.

References

Australian news websites
Australian entertainment websites
Defunct Australian websites
Network 10
2018 establishments in Australia
2020 disestablishments in Australia
Internet properties established in 2018
Internet properties disestablished in 2020